Mikuláš Karlík (born 17 May 1999) is a Czech biathlete. He competed in the 2022 Winter Olympics.

Career
Karlík started biathlon in 2010. He was a successful biathlete as a junior, winning three medals at the Biathlon Junior World Championships. He competed in multiple biathlon events at the 2022 Winter Olympics. He was part of the Czech team in the mixed relay, placing 12th out of 20 teams. He placed 31st in the individual event, 28th in the sprint, and 42nd in the pursuit.

References

1999 births
Living people
Biathletes at the 2022 Winter Olympics
Czech male biathletes
Olympic biathletes of the Czech Republic
People from Ústí nad Orlicí
Sportspeople from the Pardubice Region